John William Hiland (September 1860 – April 10, 1901) was a Major League Baseball Second baseman from Baltic, Connecticut. He played three games in 1885 with the Philadelphia Quakers, and he did not record a career hit. Hiland died on April 10, 1901, in Philadelphia.

External links
Baseball Reference

Philadelphia Quakers players
1860 births
Date of birth missing
1901 deaths
Baseball players from Connecticut
Lancaster (minor league baseball) players
Lancaster Ironsides players
Baltimore Monumentals (minor league) players
Trenton Trentonians players
Jersey City Jerseys players
Jersey City Skeeters players
London Tecumsehs (baseball) players
19th-century baseball players